Lucius Tiberius Claudius Pompeianus was a Roman senator and aristocrat of the 3rd century. He served as ordinary consul in 231 with Titus Flavius Sallustius Paelignianus as his colleague. His full name, previously known as Claudius Pompeianus, was only known after the discovery of a military diploma.

Although Pompeianus came from Antioch, he had deep Roman roots. His father was Lucius Aurelius Commodus Pompeianus, ordinary consul in 209.  His grandfather was Tiberius Claudius Pompeianus, suffect consul in 162 and ordinary consul in 173, and his grandmother was the daughter of the Emperor Marcus Aurelius, Lucilla.Allmer, Auguste & de Terrebasse, Alfred. Inscriptions antiques et du Moyen Age de Vienne en Dauphiné, Volume 3, p. 504-07 (1875)

References

3rd-century Romans
Imperial Roman consuls
Pompeianus, Lucius Tiberius